Kepler-411 is a binary star system. Its primary star Kepler-411 is a K-type main-sequence star, orbited by the red dwarf star Kepler-411B on a wide orbit, discovered in 2012.

Primary star
Kepler-411 is similar to the Sun in its concentration of heavy elements, with a metallicity Fe/H index of 0.11, but is much younger at an age of 212 million years. 

Kepler-411 exhibits significant starspot activity, with starspots covering 1.7% of the stellar surface. Darker starspots are concentrated around the equator of the star. Kepler-411 exhibits differential rotation, but with smaller amount of differential shear compared to the Sun.

It is a red dwarf and a flare star.

Planetary system
In 2013, one planet, named Kepler-411b, was discovered, followed by planet Kepler-411c in 2016. Third planet in system detected by transit method, d, along with e detected by radial velocity method, were discovered in 2019.

References

Cygnus (constellation)
Planetary transit variables
K-type main-sequence stars
Planetary systems with four confirmed planets
J19102533+4931237
1781
Binary stars